Asa Wentworth Tenney (May 20, 1833 – December 10, 1897) was a United States district judge of the United States District Court for the Eastern District of New York.

Education and career

Born in Dalton, New Hampshire, Tenney graduated from Dartmouth College in 1859 and read law to enter the bar in 1863. He was in private practice in Brooklyn and New York City, New York from 1863 to 1897. He was United States Attorney for the Eastern District of New York from 1877 to 1885.

Federal judicial service

On July 2, 1897, Tenney was nominated by President William McKinley to a seat on the United States District Court for the Eastern District of New York vacated by Judge Charles L. Benedict. Tenney was confirmed by the United States Senate on July 8, 1897, and received his commission the same day. He served until his death in Brooklyn on December 10, 1897. He was buried at Green-Wood Cemetery.

References

1833 births
1897 deaths
19th-century American politicians
Burials at Green-Wood Cemetery
Judges of the United States District Court for the Eastern District of New York
People from Coös County, New Hampshire
United States Attorneys for the Eastern District of New York
United States federal judges admitted to the practice of law by reading law
United States federal judges appointed by William McKinley